Dicamba (3,6-dichloro-2-methoxybenzoic acid) is a broad-spectrum herbicide first registered in 1967.  Brand names for formulations of this herbicide include Dianat, Banvel, Diablo, Oracle and Vanquish.  This chemical compound is a chlorinated derivative of o-anisic acid.

Around 2016, dicamba's use came under significant scrutiny due to its tendency to spread from treated fields into neighboring fields, causing damage.

Use as an herbicide 
Dicamba kills annual and perennial broadleaf weeds. Its primary commercial applications are weed control for grain crops and turf areas. It is also used to control brush and bracken in pastures, as well as controlling legumes and cacti.  In combination with a phenoxy herbicide or with other herbicides, dicamba can be used for weed control in range land and other noncrop areas (fence rows, roadways, and wastage).  Dicamba is toxic to conifer species but is in general less toxic to grasses.

Dicamba is a synthetic auxin that functions by increasing plant growth rate, leading to senescence and cell death.

The growth regulating properties of dicamba were first discovered by Zimmerman and Hitchcock in 1942.  Soon after, Jealott's Hill Experimental Station in England was evaluating dicamba in the field.  Dicamba has since been used for household and commercial weed control.

Increasing use of dicamba has been reported with the release of dicamba-resistant genetically modified plants by Monsanto. In October 2016, the EPA launched a criminal investigation into the illegal application of older, drift prone formulations of dicamba onto these new plants. Older formulations have been reported to drift after application and affect other crops not meant to be treated. A less volatile formulation of dicamba made by Monsanto, designed to be less prone to vaporizing and inhibit unintended drift between fields, was approved for use in the United States by the EPA in 2016, and was commercially available in 2017.

Resistance 
Some farmers and researchers have expressed concern about herbicide resistance after the introduction of resistant crops. In the laboratory, researchers have demonstrated weed resistance to dicamba within three generations of exposure. Similar herbicide resistant weeds arose after the introduction of glyphosate-resistant crops (marketed as 'Roundup Ready'). Some weed species, like Amaranthus palmeri, have developed resistance to dicamba. Dicamba resistance in Bassia scoparia was discovered in 1994 and has not been explained by common modes of resistance such as absorption, translocation, or metabolism.

Genetically modified crops 
The soil bacterium Pseudomonas maltophilia (strain DI-6) converts dicamba to 3,6-dichlorosalicylic acid (3,6-DCSA), which is adsorbed to soil much more strongly than is dicamba, but lacks herbicidal activity. Little information is available on the toxicity of this breakdown intermediate. The enzymes responsible for this first breakdown step comprise a three-component system called dicamba O-demethylase.

Monsanto recently incorporated one component of the three enzymes into the genome of soybean, cotton, and other broadleaf crop plants, making them resistant to dicamba. Monsanto has marketed their dicamba resistant crops under the brand name Xtend.

Farmers have expressed concern about being forced to grow resistant crops as protection against drifting dicamba.

Volatilization 

Dicamba came under scrutiny due to its tendency to vaporize from treated fields and spread to neighboring crops. Monsanto began offering crops resistant to dicamba before a reformulated and drift resistant herbicide, which they claimed would be less likely to affect neighboring fields, had gained approval from the Environmental Protection Agency. Incidents in which dicamba affected neighboring fields led to complaints from farmers and fines in some US states.   A lower volatility formulation, M1768, was approved by the EPA in November 2016. However, this formulation has not been evaluated by experts outside of Monsanto.

Dicamba formulations, including those registered in the late 2010s, can be especially prone to volatility, temperature inversions near ground level, and drift.

Toxicological effects 
Dicamba does not present unusual handling hazards.

Humans 
Increased cancer rate ratios and positive exposure–response patterns were reported (among other Canada/US-registered pesticides) for dicamba, in a review of data gathered in the National Institutes of Health's Agricultural Health Study. In addition, the risk of non-Hodgkins lymphoma in men was statistically significantly increased by exposure to dicamba, in the Cross-Canada Study of Pesticides and Health.

Mammals 
It is moderately toxic by ingestion and slightly toxic by inhalation or dermal exposure (oral  in rats: 757 mg/kg body weight, dermal LD50 in rats: >2,000 mg/kg, inhalation LC50 in rats: >200 mg/L). In a three-generation study, dicamba did not affect the reproductive capacity of rats.

When rabbits were given doses of 0, 0.5, 1, 3, 10, or 20 (mg/kg)/day of technical dicamba from days 6 through 18 of pregnancy, toxic effects on the mothers, slightly reduced fetal body weights, and increased loss of fetuses occurred at the 10 mg/kg dose. U.S. Environmental Protection Agency (EPA) has set the NOAEL for this study at 3 (mg/kg)/day.

In dog tests, some enlargement of liver cells has occurred, but a similar effect has not been shown in humans.

Aquatic animals 
Dicamba was tested for acute toxicity in a variety of aquatic animals. The studies accepted by the U.S. EPA found dicamba acid and DMA salt to be practically nontoxic to aquatic invertebrates. Studies accepted by the U.S. EPA found dicamba acid to be slightly toxic to cold water fish (rainbow trout), and practically nontoxic to warm water fish. Recent studies suggest that dicamba should be considered to be a potential endocrine disruptor for fish at environmentally relevant concentrations.

Environmental fate

Soil 
Dicamba is released directly to the environment by its application as an herbicide for the control of annual broadleaf weeds. It may cause damage to plants as a result of its absorption from the soil by plant roots. Dicamba is mobile in most soils and significant leaching is possible. The adsorption of dicamba to organo-clay soil is influenced by soil pH with the greatest adsorption to soil occurring in acidic soils. Dicamba is moderately persistent in soil. Its reported half-life in soil ranges from 1 to 6 weeks. Dicamba is likely to be more rapidly degraded in soils with high microbial populations, but dissipates more slowly in hardwood forests and wetlands than would be expected from the results of laboratory studies.

At a level of 10 mg/kg in sandy loam soil, dicamba caused a transient decrease in nitrification after two but not three weeks of incubation. The investigator determined that the decrease in nitrification is not substantial and does not suggest the potential for a prolonged impact on microbial activity. In the same study, dicamba did not affect ammonia formation or sulfur oxidation. In a more recent laboratory study, dicamba, at a concentration of 1 mg/kg soil, did not affect urea hydrolysis or nitrification in four soil types.

Water 
Dicamba salts used in some herbicides are highly soluble in water. A recent study conducted from 1991 to 1996 by the U.S. Geologic Survey found dicamba in 0.13% of the ground waters surveyed. The maximum level detected was 0.0021 mg/L. The prevalence of dicamba in groundwater from agricultural areas (0.11%) did not correlate with nonagricultural urban areas (0.35%).

Legality 
Arkansas and Missouri banned the sale and use of dicamba in July 2017 in response to complaints of crop damage due to drift. Monsanto responded by arguing that not all instances of crop damage had been investigated and a ban was premature. Monsanto sued the state of Arkansas to stop the ban, but the case was dismissed in February 2018. It has also been acknowledged that the use of dicamba had increased since 2017. Complaints against dicamba accelerated after the EPA approved a Monsanto-created soybean which could tolerate it in 2016. The soybean was a part of Monsanto's Xtend products.

In June 2020, the 9th U.S. Circuit Court of Appeals blocked sales of three dicamba-based herbicides in the United States, finding that the Environmental Protection Agency understated risks of spraying. On 8 June 2020, the EPA clarified that existing stocks of the dicamba-based pesticides bought before 3 June 2020 may be used according to their previous labels until 31 July 2020.  In October 2020 the EPA issued a decision on the registration application of three dicamba-based products, Xtendimax, Engenia, and Tavium.   They  approved of their use from 2021 to 2025 with some additional changes, including labeling restrictions.

Lawsuits

In February 2018, it was reported that numerous farmers from 21 states had filed lawsuits against Monsanto alleging that dicamba damaged their crops, with the most prominent cases coming from Missouri and Arkansas. By August 2019, more lawsuits were filed, alleging that dicamba had damaged crops, gardens, and trees of neighbors of the farmers who used it.

On 27 January 2020, the first trial concerning dicamba-related products began in Cape Girardeau, Missouri. The lawsuit involves a peach farmer who alleged that dicamba-based herbicides caused significant damage to his crops and trees. It had also been filed in November 2016, when dicamba was still owned by Monsanto. On 14 February 2020, the jury involved in the lawsuit ruled against dicamba owner Bayer and its co-defendant BASF and found in favor of the peach grower, Bader Farms owner Bill Bader. Bayer and BASF were also ordered to pay Bader $15 million in damages. On 15 February 2020, Monsanto and BASF were ordered to pay an additional $250 million in punitive damages. Court documents revealed Monsanto had used dicamba drift as a sales pitch to convince farmers to buy their proprietary dicamba-resistant seeds or face devastated crops.

On 17 February, it was announced that dicamba would face many more lawsuits. On 26 February, the Peiffer Wolf Carr & Kane Law Firm announced that after the Bader verdict, more than 2,000 U.S. farmers hired the law firm to represent them in upcoming lawsuits.

In June 2020, Bayer agreed to a settlement of up to $400 million for all 2015-2020 crop year dicamba claims, not including the $250 million judgement. On 25 November 2020, U.S. District Judge Stephen Limbaugh Jr. reduced the punitive damage amount in the Bader Farms case to $60 million.

References

Notes

Citations

External links 

 Appendix E: Herbicide Information, US Department of Agriculture
 Chemical Fact Sheet, Speclab.com
 Dicamba Technical Fact Sheet – National Pesticide Information Center
 Dicamba General Fact Sheet – National Pesticide Information Center
 Dicamba Pesticide Information Profile – Extension Toxicology Network
 Monsanto's Xtend Crop System Product Page
 EPA Dicamba Reregistration Eligibility Decision

Auxinic herbicides
Benzoic acids
Chloroarenes
Salicylyl ethers